Donald S. Zagoria (born August 24, 1928) is an American author and director of the Forum on Asia-Pacific Security. He worked for the RAND Corporation and taught at Hunter College. Zagoria was a consultant to the National Security Council and the Bureau of East Asian and Pacific Affairs of the State Department when Jimmy Carter was in office. He has written or edited four books and more than 300 articles on international relations.

Education
He earned his B.A. at Rutgers University and his M.A. and Ph.D. at Columbia University.

References

American non-fiction writers
1928 births
Living people
Columbia University alumni
Rutgers University alumni
Hunter College faculty